Gynatoma is a genus of flies in the family Empididae.

Species
G. atra Malloch, 1931
G. continens Collin, 1928
G. evanescens Collin, 1928
G. pygmaea Collin, 1928
G. quadrilineata Collin, 1928
G. subfulva Collin, 1928

References

Empidoidea genera
Empididae
Diptera of Australasia